These are the Australian Country number-one albums of 2018, per the ARIA Charts.

See also
2018 in music
List of number-one albums of 2018 (Australia)

References

2018
Australia country albums
Number-one country albums